Comedians (German: Komödianten) is a 1925 German silent film directed by Karl Grune and starring Lya De Putti, Eugen Klöpfer and Hermann Picha.

Cast
 Lya De Putti as Die Sentimentale  
 Eugen Klöpfer as Axel Swinborne - Schauspieler  
 Hermann Picha as Direktors Garderobier  
 Viktor Schwanneke as Direktor des Residenztheaters  
 Jaro Fürth as Inspazient  
 Fritz Rasp as Jugendlicher Liebhaber  
 Fritz Kampers as Der erste Held  
 Owen Gorin as Ein junger Prinz  
 Ferry Sikla as Schmierendirektor  
 Margarete Kupfer as Die Frau Direktor  
 Adolf E. Licho as Charakterspieler  
 Joseph Römer 
 Robert Leffler

References

Bibliography
 Bock, Hans-Michael & Bergfelder, Tim. The Concise CineGraph. Encyclopedia of German Cinema. Berghahn Books, 2009.

External links

1925 films
Films of the Weimar Republic
Films directed by Karl Grune
German silent feature films
German black-and-white films